The 2009–10 season is C.A. River Plate's 80th season in Primera División Argentina.

Apertura Squad

Clausura Squad

Squads Stats

Competitions

Overall

Apertura

Matches

Clausura

References

External links

River Plate
Club Atlético River Plate seasons